Guns is a magazine dedicated to firearms, hunting, competition shooting, reloading, and other shooting-related activities in the United States. First published in 1955, it is one of the oldest periodicals about firearms in continuous publication in the United States

The magazine primarily offers reviews on guns, ammunition, and shooting gear; as well as gunsmithing tips, historical articles, gun collecting, self-defense, and alerts on gun rights. In addition to those departments, each issue contains a few featured articles and personality profiles of people in the firearms industry as well as press releases of new products.

References

External links
 Official website

Monthly magazines published in the United States
Sports magazines published in the United States
Firearms magazines
Hunting and fishing magazines
Magazines established in 1955
Magazines published in California
1955 establishments in the United States
Mass media in San Diego